The Isis Highway is a state highway in southern Queensland, Australia. The Isis Highway links the sugar producing Bundaberg and Fraser Coast regions with the cattle farming districts of the North Burnett.

The highway takes its name from the Isis River, which flows between Maryborough and Childers. The highway also passes through a significant amount of the former Isis Shire local government area, of which Childers was the administrative centre.

The Isis Highway is signed as State Route 3 between Bundaberg and Childers, and State Route 52 between Childers and Ban Ban Springs. The section between Bundaberg and Childers is a state-controlled regional road (number 19A) while that between Childers and Ban Ban Springs is a state-controlled strategic road (numbers 19B and 19C)

Route description
The road commences at a roundabout in Bundaberg North as State Route 3 and runs south as Hinkler Avenue, crossing the Burnett River on the Don Tallon Bridge. Most of this section is one lane in each direction. After  it passes through a five-way intersection, crossing Bourbong Street and turning south-west on Takalvan Street. This four lane road continues for a further  to the Airport Drive / Kendalls Road exit, where it becomes Childers Road, reverting to two lanes.

Childers Road passes to the west of Bundaberg Airport and through the outer suburbs of Kensington and Branyan before reaching the village of South Bingera. From there to Apple Tree Creek it passes through a mixture of farm land and forest, with sugar cane and other crops intermixed.

Roads of Strategic Importance upgrade
The Roads of Strategic Importance initiative, last updated in March 2022, includes the following project for the Isis Highway.

Overtaking lanes
A project to construct overtaking lanes on the Isis Highway, at an estimated cost of $5 million, was completed in mid-2021.

Other upgrades
A project to improve safety in various locations, at a cost of $41.8 million, was expected to be completed in 2024.

Towns along the Isis Highway 
 Bundaberg
 Cordalba
 Childers
 Dallarnil
 Degilbo
 Biggenden
 Coalstoun Lakes

Major intersections

Gallery

See also 

 Highways in Australia
 List of highways in Queensland
 List of numbered roads in Queensland

References

Highways in Queensland
Bundaberg
Wide Bay–Burnett